Charlotte Sterry defeated Louisa Martin 6–3, 6–4 in the All Comers' Final, and then defeated the reigning champion Blanche Hillyard 6–2, 6–2 in the challenge round to win the ladies' singles tennis title at the 1901 Wimbledon Championships. Mme Pop was the first female competitor from France to participate in the Wimbledon Championships.

Draw

Challenge round

All comers' finals

Top half

Bottom half

References

External links

Ladies' Singles
Wimbledon Championship by year – Women's singles
Wimbledon Championships - Singles
Wimbledon Championships - Singles